Csernai is a surname. Notable people with the surname include:

 Pál Csernai (1932–2013), Hungarian football player and manager, brother of Tibor
 Tibor Csernai (1938–2012), Hungarian footballer

Hungarian-language surnames